Parliamentary elections were held in Greece on 5 March 1933. The pro-monarchist People's Party emerged as the largest party, winning 118 of the 248 seats in Parliament, ending the predominance of Eleftherios Venizelos' Liberal Party. The results triggered an attempted coup by Venizelist officers. A military emergency government under Alexandros Othonaios was instituted which suppressed the revolt, and was succeeded by a People's Party cabinet under Panagis Tsaldaris on 10 March.

Results

References

Parliamentary elections in Greece
Greece
Legislative election
1930s in Greek politics
History of Greece (1924–1941)
Greece
Election and referendum articles with incomplete results
Legl